Sgurr an Airgid (841 m) is a mountain in the Northwest Highlands, Scotland. It lies on the northern shore of Loch Duich in Kintail.

Although the mountain is lower in height than many of its neighbours, it still offers excellent views from its summit. The path zig zags up to the top. The nearest main village is Dornie.

References

Mountains and hills of the Northwest Highlands
Marilyns of Scotland
Corbetts